Andrew Charles Clark (born 24 August 1974) is an Australian former soccer player, who played as a defender. As a player, had stints in the Australian National Soccer League (NSL) and A-League, most notably for Canberra Cosmos, Parramatta Power and the Central Coast Mariners. Since the later part of his playing career, he has worked as a fitness coach, including stints with the Central Coast Mariners, Vegalta Sendai, Sydney FC and the Australian national soccer team.

Early life
Clark was born in Gosford, on the Central Coast of New South Wales.

Playing career

Early years
Clark played youth football for a number of clubs on the Central Coast, including Central Coast FC, where he played several seasons in the first team in the 1990s. In 1997, he was one of four Australians signed by Five-One-Seven to play in the Hong Kong First Division League in 1997–98. He spent the subsequent twelve years playing for a number of clubs in New South Wales, with the exception of a season in Malaysia with Kedah FA in the 2003 Liga Perdana 1.

Clark announced that he would be retiring as a player in February 2010, at the end of the 2009–10 Central Coast Mariners season.

Coaching career
Clark took up a position as the strength and conditioning coach at Central Coast Mariners while still a player for the club.

In late 2013, it was announced that Clark would be leaving the Mariners, following former Central Coast head coach Graham Arnold for a position with Vegalta Sendai in the J.League. He left Vegalta shortly after Arnold was sacked by the club in April 2014.

Clark signed on to be Sydney FC's head of strength and conditioning in May 2014, again linking up with Arnold.
He then moved to the Socceroos to become the head of high performance, once again following Gram Arnold. Andrew has been with the Socceroos for 4 years.

Honours

Club
Central Coast Mariners:
A-League Premiership: 2007–08
A-League Pre-Season Challenge Cup: 2005

See also
List of Central Coast Mariners FC players
List of foreign Malaysian League players

References

External links
 
 Oz Football profile

1974 births
Living people
People from Gosford
Association football central defenders
Australian soccer players
Australian expatriate soccer players
Expatriate footballers in Malaysia
Australian expatriate sportspeople in Malaysia
Australian expatriate sportspeople in Hong Kong
Expatriate footballers in Hong Kong
A-League Men players
National Soccer League (Australia) players
Central Coast Mariners FC players
Parramatta Power players
Central Coast Mariners FC non-playing staff
Sportsmen from New South Wales
Soccer players from New South Wales